Mohamandust-e Olya or Mehmandust-e Olya may refer to:
 Mohamandust-e Olya, Meshgin Shahr
 Mehmandust-e Olya, Nir